Quazi Sazzad Hossain is a Bangladesh academic and Vice-Chancellor of Khulna University of Engineering & Technology.

Early life 
Hossain graduated from Narail Government Victoria College, and Universiti Sains Malaysia.

Career 
Hossain was a professor of the civil engineering department of Khulna University of Engineering & Technology.

On 13 August 2018, Hossain was appointed the Vice-Chancellor of the Khulna University of Engineering & Technology. He received three new buses for the university in 2019.

In December 2020, the wife of his personal secretary, Saifullah Palash, was detained for allegedly taking bribes on the promise of providing jobs at Khulna University of Engineering & Technology.

Hossain closed the Khulna University of Engineering & Technology in the first week of December 2021 after students and teachers were agitated over the death Professor Dr Mohammad Selim Hossain who died following harassment by Bangladesh Chhatra League activists.

In August 2022, Hossain signed an agreement with Huawei to establish an ICT academy at the Khulna University of Engineering & Technology.

References 

Living people
People from Narail District
Universiti Sains Malaysia alumni
Bangladeshi civil engineers
Bangladeshi academics
Bangladeshi academic administrators
Year of birth missing (living people)
Academic staff of Khulna University of Engineering & Technology